HD 90089 (HR 4084 ; Gliese 392.1) is a star located in the northern circumpolar constellation Camelopardalis. With an apparent magnitude of 5.25, it is faintly visible to the naked eye under ideal conditions. This star is located relatively close at a distance of 75 light years, but is drifting away at a rate of almost 8 km/s.

HD 90089 is an F4 main-sequence star with the calcium K-line and metallic lines of an F2 star. Although the spectral type is of a form that would indicate an Am star, it is not listed in any of the major catalogues of chemically peculiar stars. At present it has 1.29 times the mass of the Sun and 1.4 times its radius.

HD 90089's exact age depends on the method, with X-ray giving it a young age of only 300 million years. David et al. gave it an age of 1.1 billion years, significantly older than the previous solution; it spins rapidly with a projected rotational velocity of 56.2 km/s, and has an M0 companion separated 13" away   and at approximately the same distance.

An infrared excess has been detected around this star, most likely indicating the presence of a circumstellar disk at a radius of 145 AU. The temperature of this dust is 30 K.

References

External links
 HR 4084
 Image HD 90089

Camelopardalis (constellation)
090089
051502
F-type main-sequence stars
4084
Suspected variables
Durchmusterung objects
Am stars